Sir Joseph Edward Hotung (1930 – 16 December 2021) was a Hong Kong businessman, art collector, and philanthropist.

Biography 
Hotung was born in 1930 in Shanghai to Edward Hotung, a founder of the Chinese Gold and Silver Exchange in Hong Kong, and his wife, Alice Maud Newman (aka "Mordia O'Shea"). He had an elder brother, Eric, who died in 2017, and two sisters, Mary and Antonia. His grandfather was tycoon Sir Robert Hotung (1862-1956), known as "the grand old man of Hong Kong", who, by the age of 35, had become the richest man in the territory. 

Joseph Hotung was educated at St Francis Xavier College, Shanghai; St Louis College, Tientsin; the Catholic University of America; and the University of London, from which he received a LL.B.

Hotung began his career at Marine Midland Bank, New York, shortly after finishing his education, and returned to Hong Kong, after his father and grandfather died, to start his own business. He was involved in the family's Hong Kong real estate development and investment business, and served as a director of The Hongkong and Shanghai Banking Corporation, HSBC Holdings plc, and the Hongkong Electric Company.

Hotung was a supporter of many educational institutions. He funded the Hong Kong Academy for Gifted Education with the Government of Hong Kong, endowed a program for Law, Human Rights, and Peace Building in the Middle East at SOAS University of London, funded HIV/AIDS research at St George's, University of London, endowed a post-doctoral fellowship at Columbia University's Weatherhead East Asian Institute, and founded the lecture theater at Mansfield College, Oxford. He also served as a council member of the University of Hong Kong and a member of the governing board of SOAS University of London.

Hotung was a collector of Chinese art, including Chinese jades, porcelain, bronzes, and furniture. 

A patron of the arts, he was the first chairman of the Hong Kong Arts Development Council and was a trustee of the Metropolitan Museum of Art, the Freer Gallery of Art, and the British Museum, where he served as a trustee from 1994 to 2004. He donated the Sir Joseph Hotung Gallery of China and South Asia and the Joseph Hotung Great Court Gallery at the museum.

He was knighted by Queen Elizabeth II in 1993. He received honorary degrees from St George's, University of London, University of Hong Kong, and the University of London.

Personal life 
Hotung died on 16 December 2021, aged 91. He had 4 children from a previous marriage to Mary McGinley Hotung.

References 

1930 births
2021 deaths
Ho family
Catholic University of America alumni
Alumni of University of London Worldwide
Hong Kong philanthropists
Hong Kong businesspeople
Hong Kong collectors
HSBC people
Knights Bachelor